Pisarovina is a municipality in Croatia in the Zagreb County. According to the 2001 census, there are 3,697 inhabitants, absolute majority which are Croats.

Settlements
 Bratina
 Bregana Pisarovinska
 Donja Kupčina
 Dvoranci
 Gorica Jamnička
 Gradec Pokupski
 Jamnica Pisarovinska
 Lijevo Sredičko
 Lučelnica
 Pisarovina
 Podgorje Jamničko
 Selsko Brdo
 Topolovec Pisarovinski
 Velika Jamnička

History
In the late 19th and early 20th century, Pisarovina was a district capital in the Zagreb County of the Kingdom of Croatia-Slavonia.

There is a legend about the making of Pisarovina. According to this legend, at the place where Pisarovina is today, there was a count's estate, which is a historical fact. Countess Sara lived there, who was seriously ill. There were numerous vineyards around the Count's estate and Sarah probably really liked to drink wine. At that moment her servants, the contractors, offered her wine, and they told her, "Sarah, drink some wine!" (Pij Saro vina) - That's what the legend of the name Pisarovina says.

References

External links 
 Official site

Populated places in Zagreb County
Zagreb County (former)
Municipalities of Croatia